Triglochin gaspensis (common name - Gaspé Peninsula arrow grass) is a species of flowering plant in the family Juncaginaceae, native to eastern Canada (New Brunswick, Newfoundland island, Nova Scotia, Prince Edward Island and Quebec), and Maine in the north-eastern United States, where it is found growing in the tidal zone of the Atlantic coast below the high-water mark. It was first described by Helmut Lieth and Doris Löve in 1961.

References

External links
Triglochin gaspensis images from iNaturalist

Juncaginaceae
Flora of New Brunswick
Flora of Newfoundland
Flora of Nova Scotia
Flora of Prince Edward Island
Flora of Quebec
Flora of Maine
Plants described in 1961
Flora without expected TNC conservation status